2si was an American engine manufacturer located in Beaufort, South Carolina. The company was a wholly owned subsidiary of the AMW Cuyuna Engine Company, formerly known as the Cuyuna Development Company.

The company acquired a line of two-stroke engines that were originally designed and produced by JLO of Germany and marketed them under the Cuyuna brand name for snowmobile and later ultralight aircraft use. Later Cuyuna formed a subsidiary Two Stroke International, commonly known as 2si, to  produce and market the engine line. Cuyuna ended selling engines for aircraft use, but instead switched to marketing them only for industrial, marine, auto racing, kart and all-terrain vehicle applications.

The company seems to have gone out of business in 2014.

Engines 
215 - aircraft, multifuel, industrial engine
230 - aircraft, multifuel, industrial engine
340 - aircraft engine
430 - aircraft and snowmobile engine
460 - aircraft, multifuel, marine, industrial and sport vehicle engine
500 - sport vehicle engine
540 - aircraft and sport vehicle engine
690 - aircraft, marine, industrial engine
808 - aircraft engine

See also

References

External links
Company website archives on Archive.org

Aircraft engine manufacturers of the United States